Guilty or Not Guilty was a Canadian panel quiz show television series which aired on CBC Television from 1958 to 1959.

Premise
Duncan Crux, a lawyer, hosted this Vancouver-produced series. Actual legal cases were presented in a trial format to a panel which resembled a jury. After the panel delivered their verdict, the case's real-life verdict was revealed.

Scheduling
This half-hour series was broadcast on Sundays at 1:00 p.m. (Eastern) from 5 October 1958 to 31 January 1959.

References

External links
 

CBC Television original programming
1950s Canadian game shows
1958 Canadian television series debuts
1959 Canadian television series endings
Black-and-white Canadian television shows
Court shows
Television shows filmed in Vancouver